Vaitheeswara Vidyalayam ( Vaittīsvara Vittiyālayam, also known as Vaidyeshwara College) is a provincial school in Jaffna, Sri Lanka.

See also
 List of schools in Northern Province, Sri Lanka

References

Provincial schools in Sri Lanka
Schools in Jaffna